Kabul Medical University (Pashto د کابل طبي پوهنتون / Dari: پوهنتون طبي کابل) formerly known as Kabul Medical Institute) is located in Kabul, Afghanistan on the campus of Kabul University. The medical institution was initially maintained by collaboration with the Turkish and French sponsors. KMF developed into a single autonomous University in 2005. KMU is a coeducational center with below 1000 enrolment. It currently graduates professionals in fields of Curative Medicine, Pediatric, Stomatology, Dental and Nursing. In 2012 two new departments of Medical Technology and Anesthesia were also added.  All subjects are taught in Dari and Pashto but most medical terms are in English.

More than 25 medical schools are known to exist in Afghanistan but KMU is known to be the top leading medical school in the country.

History

Up to the beginning of the 1980s, Afghan Medical Schools were under Kabul University and the Ministry of Education; however, after Russian occupation, all Medical Schools came under the jurisdiction of the Ministry of Public Health and later on the Ministry of Higher Education.

1996-2001
During the days of the Taliban, women were not allowed to study medicine at Kabul Medical University, not even under the cover of the  burka.

2001-2021 

The University of Manitoba's medical school along with University of Nebraska Medical Center helped the Kabul Medical University rebuild its library after the war. University of Nebraska Medical Center provided KMU with scholarships for KMU lectures and students as well as provided it with up-to-date medical technology and research based institutions like Cardiac Research Center. Manitoba put together a basic collection of 672 medical textbooks.

In 2007 Kabul Medical University cooperated with the King Edward Medical University of Lahore Pakistan in training students. Kabul Medical University is in one of Afghanistan's high ranking universities.

Under the Taliban rule women were not allowed to study in medical field, but in May 2006 first group of Afghan women celebrated their achievement. Out of 460 students of Kabul Medical University 90 were Afghanistan's first group of female graduates after the fall of Taliban. They studied for dentistry and paediatric.

References

External links

Official website of Kabul Medical University

Medical schools in Afghanistan
Universities and colleges in Kabul